The 1935 Mississippi State Teachers Yellow Jackets football team was an American football team that represented the Mississippi State Teachers College (now known as the University of Southern Mississippi) as a member of the Southern Intercollegiate Athletic Association during the 1935 college football season. In their fifth year under head coach Pooley Hubert, the team compiled a 6–4 record.

Schedule

References

Mississippi State Teachers
Southern Miss Golden Eagles football seasons
Mississippi State Teachers Yellow Jackets football